CEPCO is a construction company with corporate headquarters in Jeddah, Saudi Arabia, with offices throughout Saudi Arabia and in Middle East. CEPCO has been in business since 1977 and provides construction services in the fields of Civil & Infrastructure, Electrical, Horizontal Directional Drilling, Electromechanical, Oil, Gas & Power.

CEPCO executes projects for civil and electrical projects in Saudi Arabia and GCC countries, especially in the field of 110 KV up to 380 KV Cable Systems, Delivery, Installation and Testing of Transformers and Substation Construction. In the early 1990's CEPCO has also provided similar services in both Syria and Lebanon. However, since the start of 21st century such services were discontinued.

CEPCO is qualified turn-key general contractor with Saudi Electricity Company – Western, Eastern, Southern and Central Regions.

CEPCO has executed a number of projects and had a turnover in excess of $150 million in 2007, and $500 million until end of 2008.

In addition to construction services, CEPCO is an authorized agent for world class manufacturers and provides related support and field services. As a privately owned company, CEPCO's current strategy is to enhance its growth by building the company's resources and perfection of services provided.

Project fields

Civil and Infrastructure 
Specialized for turn-key contracts for water distribution, rainwater evacuation schemes, large water reservoirs and pumping stations, underground tunneling (HDD Technology), sewage systems etc. starting from design, site preparation, interface, material supply, execution, installation and commissioning. The activities include all required electro-mechanical installation for building, industrial plants and underground cables and piping.

Volumes of projects executed and currently under execution are ranging from $10–200 million.

Residential, Commercial and Industrial Buildings
Roads and Bridges
Water & Wastewater Treatment Plants and Transmission Networks

Electrical 
The main activities are in the field of Low, Medium and High Voltage Power Engineering works in Saudi Arabia and GCC countries.  These include installation, testing, commissioning and maintenance works for Substations, Transformers, Switchgears and High Voltage Underground XLPE and Oil Filled cable systems for voltage between 69 KV up to 380 KV with latest & state-of-the-art testing equipment.

Overhead Transmission
Underground Transmission 
Substations and Transformers 
Cable Laying and Splicing, Low Voltage, Medium Voltage, High Voltage & Fiber-Optic.
Communications Infrastructure, Wireless and Wire line.

Electromechanical 
CEPCO’s electro-mechanical Division is catering to large Saudi Arabian/Multinational Companies for their electro-mechanical requirements including supply, installation and maintenance of Centralized Air Conditioning System, A/C Ducting, Chilled Water Piping System, Sewage and Water Piping System etc.

Power Plant Utilities 
Instrumentation & Control 
HVAC & Plumbing 
Building Management Systems 
Fire Protection Systems
Pumping and Metering Stations
 MEP Engineering

Oil, Gas and Power 
The Persian Gulf region is experiencing tremendous growth in the Engineering, Procurement & Contracting in the Oil, Gas and Petrochemical fields creating a shortage of capable companies that can perform the projects. Basis CEPCO’s dynamic growth and past achievements, the company is expanding its EP&C capabilities in the oil, gas and the petrochemical fields. CEPCO’s EP&C capabilities include:

- Project Management, Procurement and Construction

- Electrical and Instrumentation Services

- Onshore pipe fabrication and onsite works

- Onshore installation of pressure vessels, columns and module package equipment

CEPCO has performed work for Saudi Aramco, the world’s largest oil company, in the upstream sector and the midstream sector.

Power Plants
Cement Plants
Crude Oil Refining
Oil & Gas Treatment & Processing Plants 
Oil & Gas Pipelines 
Retrofits, Upgrades and Shutdown projects

Trade 

Specialist in procurement and supply of different equipment and materials for Power Generation and Distribution to various companies and establishments throughout Saudi Arabia/Middle East.

CEPCO is an agent to over 9 international companies, selling products in electrical testing, SF6 gas handling, high voltage cable accessories, transformer tap changers and others. We have been working with well-established European and Asian companies for over 25 years, selling their products and servicing them in the Kingdom.

CEPCO is the authorized Distributor and Service Agent for the following establishments:

Authorized agents 
Pfisterer Ixosil AG
Highvolt Prueftechnik Dresden GmbH 
Baur Pruf Und Messtechnik 
MR  
Fuji Tecom Inc
DILO 
Megger Ltd.
Micafluid AG
Metrel

Associates/Partners 
ILF Consulting Engineers 
Suedkabel 
Sumitomo Corporation
Viscas (Fujikura) 
LG 
Taihan 
Nexans 
Siemens 
ABB 
Saudi Cable 
Riyadh Cables 
METS

References

Construction and civil engineering companies of Saudi Arabia
Construction and civil engineering companies established in 1977
Companies based in Jeddah
Non-renewable resource companies established in 1977
Saudi Arabian companies established in 1977